is the name of two video game publishers, Natsume-Atari and Natsume Inc., that were once the same company but are now completely separated.

Natsume Co., Ltd. was founded in Japan on October 20, 1987. It established an American division called Natsume Inc. in 1988. In 1995, Natsume Inc. split from Natsume Co., Ltd. to become an independent company. The name "Natsume" was retained by both companies in their respective countries. In 2013, Natsume Co., Ltd. renamed itself Natsume-Atari following a merger with its subsidiary Atari that year. Also in 2013, Natsume Inc. (the American company) inaugurated a Japanese division called Natsume Inc. Japan with no connection to its former parent company.

Natsume-Atari is based in Shinjuku, Tokyo, Japan and is known for developing licensed titles and mobile games.  Natsume Inc. is located in Burlingame, California and is best known for publishing unique, family-oriented niche games, such as Harvest Moon and Reel Fishing.

Products
During the NES and SNES era, Natsume Co Ltd developed numerous titles, often licensed, such as Power Rangers.  Natsume Inc published a wide range of titles, including those developed by Natsume Co. Ltd., such as S.C.A.T., Wild Guns and Shadow of the Ninja. Natsume also released the SNES game Pocky & Rocky as well as Lufia II: Rise of the Sinistrals. Natsume Co., Ltd. had also developed the Medarot games up until the end of the GBA era, and Natsume Inc. published some of them outside of Japan.

A sizeable amount of Natsume Co., Ltd.'s products were video games it developed for other publishers. Some of its biggest clients over the years included Imagineer, Bandai, THQ and Taito. Most of Natsume Co., Ltd.'s video games, as a sub-contractor, were original titles, but it occasionally developed some ports as well. Taito, in particular, outsourced the development of three of its Sega Master System ports to Natsume Co., Ltd.: Sagaia, Renegade and Special Criminal Investigation.

From the end of the Super NES era up until late 2014, Natsume Inc. was known for publishing a series of Story of Seasons games in North America. The last game in the series it published was Harvest Moon: A New Beginning for the Nintendo 3DS. In 2015 the developer of the series, Marvelous AQL, brought the next game in the series, Story of Seasons, to North America with its own US branch, Xseed Games, ending the relationship it had with Natsume. Since then, Natsume has released its own games under the Harvest Moon name, starting with Harvest Moon: The Lost Valley, continuing with Harvest Moon: Seeds of Memories and Harvest Moon: Skytree Village.

Natsume has also operated an eBay shop, selling copies of older games sealed in their original packaging, collected from storage at its offices. At auction, the company sold a sealed copy of Pocky & Rocky for over $1,600.

Corporate divisions
Natsume Co., Ltd. was previously the parent company of Natsume Inc., founded in May 1988. Natsume Inc. started publishing video games in 1990. By 1995, Natsume Inc. had broken away into its own company and is separately owned and operated.

In October 2002, Natsume Co., Ltd. founded the pachinko company Atari Inc. (not to be confused with the American game company) in Osaka, which specialized in developing slot and pinball machines.

On May 6, 2005, Natsume Solution began operation in Shinjuku. This division specializes on web site development, providing mobile solutions/services and developing web systems. On March 1, 2006, Natsume Solution was merged with Evolve.

Meanwhile, Natsume Inc. opened up a development studio of its own, named Natsume Inc. Japan.

Natsume Co., Ltd. changed its name to Natsume-Atari in October 2013, and it is not directly connected to Natsume Inc. or its subsidiary Natsume Inc. Japan. Despite their corporate split off, Natsume-Atari and Natsume Inc. have continued to collaborate on a number of occasions.

Works

Pre-split Natsume
These are games produced while Natsume Inc., was still operating as a subsidiary of Natsume Co., Ltd. Natsume Inc. would publish only Natsume Co., Ltd.'s games until becoming independent in the mid-90s.

Nintendo Entertainment System

MSX

Game Boy

Super NES

Sega Master System

Natsume-Atari / Natsume Co., Ltd.
Natsume-Atari, formerly Natsume Co., Ltd, has mostly acted as a developer since splitting from Natsume Inc. - although it has also published some games, notably in the Medarot series.

Super NES

Game Boy

Game Boy Color

Game Boy Advance

GameCube

Nintendo DS

Xbox 360

Natsume Inc. 
These are games published by Natsume Inc. and/or developed by its subsidiary in Japan after becoming independent from Natsume Co., Ltd.

Most of these games were only published by Natsume in North America, although some reached Europe under the Natsume name through distribution deals with European companies, and some digital releases were self-published by Natsume in Europe.

Super NES

Sega Saturn

Nintendo 64

PlayStation

PlayStation 2

Game Boy

Game Boy Color

Game Boy Advance

GameCube

Nintendo DS

iPhone and iPod Touch

PlayStation Portable

Wii

PlayStation 3

Nintendo 3DS

PlayStation 4

Nintendo Switch

References

External links
Natsume-Atari homepage (Japanese)
Natsume Co., Ltd. homepage (Japanese, old)
Official Natsume Inc. website
Natsume Solution/evolve co., ltd. homepage (Japanese)

Companies based in Burlingame, California
Video game companies established in 1987
Video game companies established in 1988
Video game companies of Japan
Video game development companies
Video game publishers
Japanese companies established in 1987
American companies established in 1988